Conus calhetinensis is a species of sea snail, a marine gastropod mollusk in the family Conidae, the cone snails, cone shells or cones.

These snails are predatory and venomous. They are capable of "stinging" humans.

Description
The size of the shell varies between 9 mm and 11 mm.

Distribution
This marine species is found in the Atlantic Ocean off Boa Vista Island, Cape Verde.

References

 Cossignani T. & Fiadeiro R. (2014). Cinque nuovi coni da Capo Verde. Malacologia Mostra Mondiale. 84: 21- 27 page(s): 22

External links
 To World Register of Marine Species

calhetinensis
Gastropods described in 2014
Gastropods of Cape Verde
Fauna of Boa Vista, Cape Verde